Twins is an EP by Twins.  This was their third CD and was released in January 2002. It contained a CD, which had five new songs, and a VCD, which included two music videos for "Ma Bao 668" (孖寶668) and "Ai Qing Dang Ru Xun" (愛情當入樽).

Since it was near the Chinese New Year, the song "Ma Bao 668" (孖寶668) was a greeting song for the Chinese New Year.

Track listing
"Zhu Shui Yi Shui Jiao" (著睡衣睡覺)   
"Da Lang Man Zhu Yi" (大浪漫主義)       
"She Gu Che Zhan Jian" (涉谷車站見)  
"Shen Qi Liang Nu Xia" (神奇兩女俠)   
"Ma Bao 668" (孖寶668)

2002 EPs
Twins (group) EPs